Nicholas Newton Henshall Witchell OStJ FRGS (born 23 September 1953) is an English journalist and news presenter. The latter half of his career has been as royal correspondent for BBC News.

Early life and career
Witchell was born on 23 September 1953 in Shropshire. He was educated at Epsom College, a British fee-paying school in Surrey, and at Leeds University, where he read Law and edited the Leeds Student newspaper. In 1974, Terence Dalton Limited published his book The Loch Ness Story, a history of alleged sightings of the Loch Ness Monster.

Witchell has worked for the BBC since 1976. He and Sue Lawley were the first readers of the BBC News at Six when the programme was launched on 3 September 1984 (replacing the early-evening news magazine Sixty Minutes). In 1988, the Six O'Clock News studio was invaded during a live broadcast by a group of women  protesting against the Section 28 law (which sought to prevent councils from promoting homosexuality). Witchell grappled with the protesters and was said to have sat on one woman, provoking the frontpage headline in the Daily Mirror: "Beeb Man Sits on Lesbian". During the 1989 journalists' strike, Witchell was one of the few newsreaders not to strike. This was parodied by Spitting Image with a puppet likeness shown not only breaking the journalists' strike by working, but also showing up through the news broadcast doing various other jobs within the BBC and jobs covered in the news report.

In 1989, he moved from the evening to the breakfast news slot, where he remained for five years. During the 1991 Gulf War, he was a volunteer presenter on the BBC Radio 4 News FM service.

Witchell was the first reporter to relay the news of the death in 1979 of Lord Mountbatten, the death in 1986 of former Prime Minister Harold Macmillan, the 1987 Zeebrugge ferry disaster, the 1988 Lockerbie disaster, and the death in 1997 of Diana, Princess of Wales.

Royal correspondent
In 1998, Witchell became a royal and diplomatic correspondent. In 2002, his obituary of Princess Margaret, Countess of Snowdon, recorded before her death but screened following the announcement, was reportedly not well received at Buckingham Palace, as it mentioned her lovers and "copious" consumption of whisky.

Witchell provoked royal displeasure again in 2005. At a press conference at the Swiss ski resort of Klosters, Witchell asked Charles, then-Prince of Wales, how he and his sons were feeling about his forthcoming marriage to Camilla Parker-Bowles. After a response from his son Prince William, the Prince of Wales said under his breath, and referring to Witchell, "These bloody people. I can't bear that man. I mean, he's so awful, he really is." A spokesman for the BBC defended their reporter saying, "He is one of our finest. His question was perfectly reasonable under the circumstances."

Life outside journalism

Witchell is a governor of Queen Elizabeth's Foundation for Disabled People, an Officer of the Order of St John and a Fellow of the Royal Geographical Society. He has two daughters  and currently lives in Central London with his wife Maria, née Staples.

Witchell appeared as himself in the Doctor Who Christmas Special "Voyage of the Damned", broadcast on Christmas Day 2007.

References

External links
Transcript of interview at Kloisters 31 March 2005, including a video of Witchell's response to Charles's outburst about him

1953 births
Living people
Alumni of the University of Leeds
BBC newsreaders and journalists
British male journalists
Fellows of the Royal Geographical Society
Officers of the Order of St John
People educated at Epsom College
People educated at Kingswood House School
People from Cosford, Shropshire
Royal correspondents